Sunless Sea is a survival/exploration role-playing video game with roguelike elements developed by Failbetter Games. The game was released on 6 February 2015 for Windows and OS X following a successful Kickstarter campaign to crowdfund the project. The game takes place in the universe of Failbetter's browser adventure game Fallen London, in which Victorian-era London has been moved beneath the earth's surface to the edge of the Unterzee, a vast underground ocean. On 11 October 2016, the game's first downloadable content Zubmariner was released, which allows players to explore beneath the surface of the "zee". A sequel, Sunless Skies, was announced in September 2016. It surpassed its funding goals on Kickstarter and was released on 31 January 2019.

Gameplay
The player takes on the role of an Unterzee steamship captain, whose background and ambitions are customisable. The player can win by achieving their chosen ambition, such as becoming Fallen London's most celebrated explorer or amassing enough wealth to retire. Resources to achieve these ends are acquired by discovering new locations, trading goods across the Unterzee, battling ships and "zee monsters", and completing "storylet" quests. There are several roguelike gameplay elements, such as partially randomised maps and permanent character death, but subsequent characters can inherit some of their predecessor's possessions, and a player may create a will to ensure lodging and wealth for their successors.

The actual gameplay consists of two modes- the player controlling the movement of the ship on the map with combat taking place in the same mode, and a story mode where the player is presented with several choices (sometimes accompanied by a skill challenge) in a card-like format. The ship movement is quite slow. This, accompanied by the music creates an atmosphere of tension.

The Unterzee has multiple islands, with each island having its own storylet quests. To progress in the quests, the player has to provide an item or complete a skill check. To acquire the items, the player usually is not able to acquire them at that island and must go to different islands or defeat sea beasts. The skill check takes one of the player's five skills (Hearts, Iron, Pages, Mirrors, and Veils) and based on the value of the skill gives the player a chance to pass the test. Passing the tests often will give the player items, while failing them will occasionally harm the player and will often prevent the player from trying again for a period of time.

Several bits of writing and settings in the game are literary allusions – for instance, the very premise of a subterranean "Sunless Sea" is a reference to the poem "Kubla Khan" by Samuel Taylor Coleridge, which is further reflected by the existence of a Khanate and an "Abora Gate".

Development
On 3 September 2013, Failbetter Games launched a Kickstarter campaign to crowdfund Sunless Sea with a funding goal of £60,000. The project was successfully funded, receiving around £100,000 from over 4000 backers. On 13 May 2014, the studio launched a Greenlight campaign to release the game on Steam. The game was approved 15 days later. On 17 June, the game was soft launched on the developer's website, a Steam early access build was later released on 1 July. The game officially launched on 6 February 2015.

A PlayStation 4 version, that includes the Zubmariner expansion, was released in August 2018 and a Nintendo Switch version, also including the Zubmariner expansion, was released on 23 April 2020. The Xbox One version was released the next day, on the 24th of April 2020.

Reception

Sunless Sea received mostly positive reviews from professional critics on launch, with the writing and setting being the most highly praised aspects of the game. Aggregate review website Metacritic assigned score of 81/100.

IGN awarded it 8.3 out of 10 saying "Sunless Sea gives you a wonderful world to explore that's packed with memorable written vignettes and danger."

The game won Rock, Paper, Shotgun'''s award for best game writing of 2014, and was nominated for a Writer's Guild of Great Britain Best Writing in Videogames Award in 2015.GameSpot awarded it a score of 6 out of 10, saying "Sunless Sea'' is an ambitious work that attempts to capture the sheer kinetic thrill of discovery in a bottle without the inevitable entropy of player completion depleting it, and falls well short."

, the game has sold 100,000 copies. According to director Alexis Kennedy, sales had risen to 350,000 units by June 2018.

References

External links
 

2015 video games
Alternate history video games
Crowdfunded video games
Early access video games
Gothic video games
IOS games
Kickstarter-funded video games
Linux games
MacOS games
Naval video games
Nintendo Switch games
Open-world video games
PlayStation 4 games
Post-apocalyptic video games
Roguelike video games
Single-player video games
Steam Greenlight games
Steampunk video games
Trade simulation games
Video games based on works by H. P. Lovecraft
Video games developed in the United Kingdom
Windows games
Xbox One games